Copenhagen is the capital of Denmark and can refer to the city proper, as well as several geographical and administrative divisions in and around the city: 
 Copenhagen Municipality, the largest of the municipalities making up the city of Copenhagen
 Copenhagen County, the former county of Copenhagen, separate from the municipality
 Copenhagen metropolitan area
 Urban area of Copenhagen, the central urban area of metropolitan Copenhagen

Copenhagen may also refer to:

Places 
 Copenhagen, Louisiana
 Copenhagen, New York
 Copenhagen, Ontario

Football 
 F.C. Copenhagen, a Danish football team
 Copenhagen XI, a Danish former representative football team

Military and naval ships 
 Copenhagen (horse), the horse of Arthur Wellesley, 1st Duke of Wellington
 Battle of Copenhagen (1801), a naval battle between British and the forces of Denmark–Norway
 Battle of Copenhagen (1807), a British attack of the city of Copenhagen
 Copenhagenization (naval) (AKA Copenhagening),  an old term for a pre-emptive strike on a neutral state to eliminate a possible threat.  
 København (ship), a Danish naval sail training ship that vanished without trace

Concepts 
 Copenhagen Accord, 2009 agreement of delegates at the 15th session of the Conference of Parties to the United Nations Framework Convention on Climate Change
 Copenhagen interpretation, an interpretation of quantum mechanics
 Copenhagen criteria, a list of requirements required to join the European Union
 Copenhagen Consensus, a project that seeks to establish priorities for climate change and global (human) welfare based on political-econometric analysis
 Copenhagen School (disambiguation), various "schools" of theory originating in Copenhagen within several scientific disciplines
 The Copenhagen School (theology),  a view of history during the Biblical period, whose adherents are sometimes called Biblical "minimalists" or "revisionists"
 Copenhagenization (bicycling), a concept in urban planning and design relating to the implementation of segregated bicycle facilities for utility cycling in cities

Arts and entertainment 
 "Copenhagen" (song), a 1924 popular song by Charlie Davis, recorded by many jazz performers
 Wonderful Copenhagen, the best-known song from the 1952 film Hans Christian Andersen 
 Copenhagen (album), a live album by Galaxie 500 recorded in 1990 and released in 1997
 Copenhagen (play), a 1998 play by Michael Frayn
Copenhagen (2002 film), a 2002 television film based on Frayn's play
 Copenhagen Distortion, an annual festival for street life and electronic music, since 1998
 Copenhagen (2014 film), a 2014 film by Mark Raso
 København (board game), a board game spun off from Monopoly
 Copenhagen, a 2017 song by electronic dance music duo Orbital

Other uses 
 Copenhagen paths, a term used to refer to Copenhagen-style bicycle lanes in Melbourne, Australia
 Copenhagen (tobacco), a brand of dipping tobacco (moist snuff)
 2009 United Nations Climate Change Conference (COP 15, COP/MOP 5), which took place in December 2009 in Copenhagen, Denmark
 Copenhagen Tunnel, a railway tunnel near King Cross station in London
 Copenhagen (dessert), a Greek sweet